Todd Norman Dwayne Russell (born December 22, 1966) is a Canadian politician and was the Liberal member of Parliament for the riding of Labrador, Newfoundland and Labrador from 2005 to 2011.

Early life 
Russell was born in St. Anthony, Newfoundland and raised in William's Harbour. He is of Inuit descent and was the president of Nunatukavut until his by-election win. He was educated at Memorial University in St. John's.

Federal politics 
On May 24, 2005, Russell won a by-election in the riding of Labrador, vacated by the death of Liberal MP Lawrence D. O'Brien. His victory consolidated the standing of the federal Liberals in the minority parliament, which made it easier for the Liberals to pass budget legislation. He was re-elected in the 2006 and 2008 federal elections and served as the Critic for Aboriginal Affairs in the Official Opposition Shadow Cabinet.

In the 2011 election, Russell was defeated by Conservative Peter Penashue.

After federal politics

Lower Churchill Project 
Following his electoral defeat Russell returned to the position of NunatuKavut president and has been vocal in his opposition to the Muskrat Falls hydroelectric project.

Other activities 
In 2016, Russell called on the federal government to apologize for the treatment of residential school survivors from Newfoundland and Labrador.

References

External links 
 

Members of the House of Commons of Canada from Newfoundland and Labrador
Liberal Party of Canada MPs
Métis politicians
Inuit from Newfoundland and Labrador
Canadian people of Inuit descent
1966 births
Living people
Canadian Anglicans
People from Labrador
Canadian Métis people
Memorial University of Newfoundland alumni
Indigenous Members of the House of Commons of Canada
21st-century Canadian politicians
Indigenous leaders in Atlantic Canada